La Pedrera Airport  is an airport serving the Caquetá River town of La Pedrera in the Amazonas Department of Colombia.

The runway length does not include  of unpaved overrun on the southeast end. The La Pedrera non-directional beacon (Ident: LPD) is located on the field.

Airlines and destinations

See also

Transport in Colombia
List of airports in Colombia

References

External links
OpenStreetMap - La Pedrera
OurAirports - La Pedrera
FallingRain - La Pedrera Airport

Airports in Colombia
Buildings and structures in Amazonas Department